Girlfriends is a 2021 Spanish comedy-drama film directed by Carol Rodríguez Colás which stars Vicky Luengo, Elisabet Casanovas, Carolina Yuste and Ángela Cervantes.

Plot 
The fiction (a comedy-drama) follows Marta, a photographer accustomed to operating in artsy social circles who is fired from her job and somewhat begrudgingly returns to the working-class neighborhood in Cornellà where she comes from. Upon her return, she meets with her childhood friends Desi, Soraya and Bea, rekindling their old friendship.

Cast

Production 
Girlfriends is Carol Rodríguez Colás' debut film. The screenplay was written by her sister Marina Rodríguez Colás. Juan Carlos Lausín worked as director of cinematography whereas the score was composed by Francesc Gener. It was produced by Balance Media Entertainment with the participation of RTVE, Televisió de Catalunya,  and Movistar+. It was shot in between Cornellà de Llobregat and Poblenou (Barcelona) and it was interrupted due to the health crisis caused by the COVID-19 pandemic.

Release 
Chavalas was screened at the 24th Málaga Film Festival in June 2021. The film earned three awards in Málaga: Movistar+ Award to Best Film, the Public's Choice Biznaga de Plata, and ASECAN Award for Debut Film. Distributed by Filmax, it was theatrically released on 3 September 2021.

Accolades

|-
| align="center" rowspan="13" | 2022
| rowspan=2 | 9th Feroz Awards
| colspan=2 | Best Comedy Film
|  || rowspan ="2" | 
|-
| Best Supporting Actress (film)
| Carolina Yuste
| 
|-	
| rowspan = "4" | 77th CEC Medals || Best New Director || Carol Rodríguez Colás ||  || rowspan = "4" | 
|-
| Best Supporting Actress || Carolina Yuste || 
|-
| Best New Actress || Ángela Cervantes || 
|-
| Best Original Screenplay || Marina Rodríguez Colás || 
|-
| rowspan=2 | 36th Goya Awards
| Best New Director
| Carol Rodríguez Colás
|  || rowspan = "2" | 
|-
| Best New Actress
| Ángela Cervantes
| 
|-
| rowspan = "3" | 14th Gaudí Awards || Best Actress || Vicky Luengo ||  || rowspan = "3" | 
|-
| Best Supporting Actress || Ángela Cervantes || 
|-
| Best Makeup and Hairstyles || Montse Boqueras || 
|-
| 30th Actors and Actresses Union Awards || Best Film Actress in a Minor Role || Carolina Yuste ||  || 
|-
| Spanish Screenwriters' Union Awards || Best Screenplay in a Comedy Feature Film || Marina Rodríguez Colás ||  || 
|}

See also 
 List of Spanish films of 2021

References

External links 
 Girlfriends at ICAA's Catálogo de Cinespañol
 

2021 films
2020s Spanish-language films
Films shot in Barcelona
Films set in Catalonia
Spanish comedy-drama films
2021 comedy-drama films
2020s Spanish films
2021 directorial debut films